, also known as Yoshida Kōyū, was a Japanese mathematician in the Edo period.  His popular and widely disseminated published work made him the most well known writer about mathematics in his lifetime.

He was a student of Kambei Mori (also known as Mōri Shigeyoshi). Along with Imamura Chishō and Takahara Kisshu, Yoshida became known to his contemporaries as one of "the Three Arithmeticians."

Yoshida was the author of the oldest extant Japanese mathematical text.  The 1627 work was named Jinkōki.  The work dealt with the subject of soroban arithmetic, including square and cube root operations.

Selected works
In a statistical overview derived from writings by and about Yoshida Mitsuyoshi, OCLC/WorldCat encompasses roughly 20+ works in 30+ publications in 1 language and 40+ library holdings.

 1643 — ,   OCLC 22023455088
 1659 — ,   OCLC 22057549632
 1818 — ,   OCLC 22057124215
 1850 — ,  OCLC 22055982082

See also
 Sangaku, the custom of presenting mathematical problems, carved in wood tablets, to the public in shinto shrines
 Soroban, a Japanese abacus
 Japanese mathematics

Notes

References
 Endō Toshisada (1896). . Tōkyō: _.  OCLC 122770600
 Horiuchi, Annick. (1994).   Les Mathematiques Japonaises a L'Epoque d'Edo (1600–1868): Une Etude des Travaux de Seki Takakazu (?-1708) et de Takebe Katahiro (1664–1739). 	Paris: Librairie Philosophique J. Vrin. ;   OCLC 318334322
 Restivo, Sal P. (1992).  Mathematics in Society and History: Sociological Inquiries. Dordrecht: Kluwer Academic Publishers. ;   OCLC 25709270
 David Eugene Smith and Yoshio Mikami. (1914).   A History of Japanese Mathematics. Chicago: Open Court Publishing.   OCLC 1515528 -- note alternate online, full-text copy at archive.org

External links
Sangaku

17th-century Japanese mathematicians
1598 births
1672 deaths
Japanese writers of the Edo period